Bh Se Bhade is an Indian television comedy drama show, which premiered on Zee TV. It is produced by J.D. Majethia & Aatish Kapadia. It stars Deven Bhojani, Gulfam Khan, Sarita Joshi, Suchita Trivedi, Atul Parchure, Varun Khandelwal, Bhavna Khatri, and Dushyant Wagh.

Plot 
Bh se Bhade is a show that revolves around a 55-year-old man, Mr. Bhadrakant Devilal Bhade, who has a special quality of taking away people's problems on himself. That problem could be anything under the sun. He can even take a pregnant women's pregnancy if needed for some time. But there is a condition of this exchange. Once the situation is alright, the giver has to take his problem back. Nobody has any idea about when and how Bhade developed this special quality. The Concept of the show is based on short story of popular Marathi writer Vasant Purshottam Kale aka Va.Pu.Kale by Name 'Bhade'.

Cast
Deven Bhojani as Bhadrakant Devilal Bhade
Suchita Trivedi as Sushma Bhade; Bhade's wife
Sarita Joshi as Kalyani; Bhade's mother-in-law
Varun Khandelwal as Sunil; Bhade's son
Bhavna Khatri as Menaka/Khali Khopdi ; Bhade's daughter-in-law
Dushyant Wagh as Chunky; Menaka's brother
Gulfam Khan as Lata
Atul Parchure as Bhimsen Ganguly; Bhade's boss
Sunil Holkar as Pandey, Bhade's colleague 
Nayan Shukla as Mukesh, Bhade's colleague 
Shivangi Singh as Monica, Bhade's colleague 
Subuhi Joshi as Satyawati; Bhade's Secretary
Moorti Persaud as Babli; Monica's friend
Usha Nadkarni as Inspector Usha Shinde

References

External links

Hindi comedy shows
Zee TV original programming
Indian comedy television series
2013 Indian television series debuts
2014 Indian television series endings
Hats Off Productions